Spelobia is a genus of flies belonging to the family of the Lesser Dung flies.

Species

Subgenus Bifronsina Roháček, 1982 
 Spelobia bifrons (Stenhammar, 1854) i c g 
Subgenus Eulimosina (Eulimosina, 1983)
 Spelobia ochripes (Meigen, 1830) i c g b
Subgenus Spelobia Spuler, 1924 
 Spelobia abundans (Spuler, 1925) i c g 
 Spelobia acadiensis Marshall, 1985 i c g 
 Spelobia aciculata Marshall, 1985 c g 
 Spelobia algida Marshall, 1989 c g 
 Spelobia baezi (Papp, 1977) 
 Spelobia beadyi Marshall, 1985 c g 
 Spelobia belanica Rohacek, 1983 c g 
 Spelobia bispina Marshall, 1985 i c g 
 Spelobia brevipteryx Marshall, 1985 i c g 
 Spelobia brunealata Marshall, 1985 c g 
 Spelobia brunneiptera (Papp, 1973) 
 Spelobia bumamma Marshall, 1985 i c g 
 Spelobia cambrica (Richards, 1929) 
 Spelobia clunipes (Meigen, 1830) i c g
 Spelobia costalis (Becker, 1920) 
 Spelobia curvata Marshall, 1985 i c g 
 Spelobia curvipecta Marshall, 1985 i c g 
 Spelobia czizeki (Duda, 1918) 
 Spelobia depilicercus Marshall, 1985 i c g 
 Spelobia divergens (Papp, 1973) 
 Spelobia dudai (Papp, 1978) 
 Spelobia duplisetaria (Papp, 1973) 
 Spelobia eclecta (Papp, 1973) 
 Spelobia faeroensis (Deeming, 1966) c g
 Spelobia frustrilabris Marshall, 1985 i c g 
 Spelobia fungivora Marshall, 1985 i c g 
 Spelobia ghaznavi (Papp, 1978) 
 Spelobia glabrocercata (Papp, 1973) 
 Spelobia hirsuta i c g 
 Spelobia hungarica (Villeneuve, 1917) g 
 Spelobia ibrida Rohacek, 1983 c g 
 Spelobia interima (Papp, 1973) 
 Spelobia lineatarsata (Papp, 1973) 
 Spelobia lucifuga (Spuler, 1925) i c g 
 Spelobia luteilabris (Rondani, 1880) i c g 
 Spelobia macrosetitarsalis (Papp, 1974) 
 Spelobia maculipennis (Spuler, 1925) i c g b 
 Spelobia manicata (Richards, 1927) 
 Spelobia mexicana Marshall, 1985 c g 
 Spelobia multihama i c g 
 Spelobia nana (Rondani, 1880) 
 Spelobia nigrifrons (Spuler, 1925) i c g 
 Spelobia nudiprocta Marshall, 1985 i c g 
 Spelobia occidentalis (Adams, 1904) i c g 
 Spelobia ordinaria (Spuler, 1925) i c g 
 Spelobia ovata Marshall, 1985 i c g 
 Spelobia palmata (Richards, 1927) 
 Spelobia pappi Rohacek, 1983 i c g 
 Spelobia paraczizeki (Papp, 1973) 
 Spelobia paralineatarsata (Papp, 1973) 
 Spelobia parapenetralis (Papp, 1973) 
 Spelobia parapusio (Dahl, 1909) 
 Spelobia paratalparum (Papp, 1973) 
 Spelobia peltata Marshall, 1985 i c g 
 Spelobia pickeringi Marshall, 2003 c g
 Spelobia pseudoluteilabris (Papp, 1973) 
 Spelobia pseudonivalis (Dahl, 1909) 
 Spelobia pseudosetaria (Duda, 1918) c g 
 Spelobia pseudosetitarsalis (Papp, 1973) 
 Spelobia pulliforma Marshall, 1985 i c g
 Spelobia quadrata Marshall, 1985 i c g 
 Spelobia quaesita Rohacek, 1983 c g 
 Spelobia quinata Marshall, 1985 i c g 
 Spelobia rimata Marshall, 1985 c g 
 Spelobia robinsoni Marshall, 1985 c g 
 Spelobia rufilabris (Stenhammar, 1855)
 Spelobia sejuncta Marshall, 1985 i c g 
 Spelobia semioculata (Richards, 1965) c g 
 Spelobia setilaterata (Papp, 1973) 
 Spelobia setitarsalis (Papp, 1973) 
 Spelobia simplicipes (Duda, 1925) 
 Spelobia spinifemorata (Papp, 1973) 
 Spelobia talis Rohacek, 1983 c g 
 Spelobia talparum (Richards, 1927) 
 Spelobia tenebrarum (Aldrich, 1897) i c g
 Spelobia tuberculosa Marshall, 1985 i c g 
 Spelobia tufta Marshall, 1985 i c g 
 Spelobia typhlops (Richards, 1965) c g b 
 Spelobia ulla Rohacek, 1983 c g 

Data sources: i = ITIS, c = Catalogue of Life, g = GBIF, b = Bugguide.net

References

Sphaeroceridae
Muscomorph flies of Europe
Diptera of Australasia
Diptera of North America
Diptera of Asia
Diptera of South America
Sphaeroceroidea genera